Périllos is a former commune in Pyrénées-Orientales.

History 
In the 14th century, the lord of Périllos was made a viscount by John I of Aragon as a reward for his continuous helping.

Originally independent, since 19 November 1971, it is linked with Opoul, and hence known as Opoul-Périllos. The village itself has since been abandoned.

Notes 

Former communes of Pyrénées-Orientales